Bastir Samir (born May 19, 1989) is a Ghanaian boxer who won silver in the welterweight division at the 2007 All-Africa Games. He qualified for the Olympics 2008 in the light-heavyweight division.

Career
Samir is the brother of bantamweight Issa Samir and is the team captain of Ghana's national team Black Bombers. He won the African Championships in the welterweight division in May 2007. At the All-African Games he knocked out Hosam Bakr Abdin, but lost the final bout to Rached Merdassi.

He missed the world championships as he could not make the weight and had to jump two weight classes to light-heavyweight to qualify for the 2008 Summer Olympics because Ahmed Saraku was the established middleweight. He managed to achieve this in the second qualifier.

Professional record 

|- style="margin:0.5em auto; font-size:95%;"
|align="center" colspan=8|5 Wins (5 knockouts), 0 Losses, 0 Draw
|- style="margin:0.5em auto; font-size:95%;"
|align=center style="border-style: none none solid solid; background: #e3e3e3"|Res.
|align=center style="border-style: none none solid solid; background: #e3e3e3"|Record
|align=center style="border-style: none none solid solid; background: #e3e3e3"|Opponent
|align=center style="border-style: none none solid solid; background: #e3e3e3"|Type
|align=center style="border-style: none none solid solid; background: #e3e3e3"|Rd., Time
|align=center style="border-style: none none solid solid; background: #e3e3e3"|Date
|align=center style="border-style: none none solid solid; background: #e3e3e3"|Venue and Location
|align=center style="border-style: none none solid solid; background: #e3e3e3"|Notes
|-align=center
|||  || 
|-  || -  || November 27, 2010 || align=left| 
|align=left|
|-align=center
|||  ||align=left| Damion Reed
|-  || -  || November 6, 2010 || align=left| 
|align=left|
|-align=center

References

External links
 Africa Championships
 AllAfrica games
 Qualifier
 

Living people
Welterweight boxers
Light-heavyweight boxers
1986 births
Boxers at the 2008 Summer Olympics
Olympic boxers of Ghana
Ghanaian male boxers
African Games silver medalists for Ghana
African Games medalists in boxing
Competitors at the 2007 All-Africa Games